Nuri (formerly known as Bitwala) is a blockchain banking service, headquartered in Berlin, Germany, that was founded by Jörg von Minckwitz, Jan Goslicki, and Benjamin P. Jones in October 2015.

Bitwala's concept first emerged in October 2015 when its founders Jörg von Minckwitz, Jan Goslicki, and Benjamin P. Jones launched operations for a global blockchain-based payment service provider headquartered in Berlin, Germany. According to Wired, in contrast to other money transfer services like Western Union, Money Gram, and Transferwise, the German startup utilised digital currency to offer a much faster and cheaper solution.

During Bitwala's formerly hosted a product with a global reach. Their services enabled SEPA and SWIFT money transfers by exchanging Bitcoin or Altcoins to over 20 fiat currencies to any bank account in over 200 countries worldwide.

In January 2018, Bitwala stopped their services when their prepaid card provider, WaveCrest Holdings LTD had its VISA license withdrawn due to compliance issues. The company was amongst many cryptocurrency service providers including CryptoPay, TenX and Wirex that could no longer sustain their full product offering.

Bitwala joined European Fintech Alliance in August 2018. The company launched their new website in October 2018, which coincided with the announcement of their partnership with solarisBank, a Berlin-based white label bank.

In September 2018, Bitwala raised 4 million Euro from venture capital investors Earlybird and Coparion, enabling them to proceed with their re-launch in November 2018. In December 2018 Bitwala launched Europe's first regulated blockchain banking solution that enables users to manage both their Bitcoin and Euro deposits in one place with the safety and convenience of a German bank account. The bank account is hosted by the Berlin-based Solarisbank.

Bitwala rebranded in May 2021 and changed their name to Nuri. 

Nuri filed for insolvency on Tuesday, August 9th, 2022. Their press-release states that users funds and investments are safe at their partner bank, Solarisbank.

References

Blockchain entities
Bitcoin companies